Gallowayella is a genus of lichen-forming fungi in the family Teloschistaceae. It has 15 species. The genus was circumscribed in 2012 by Sergey Kondratyuk, Natalya Fedorenko, Soili Stenroos, Ingvar Kärnefelt, Jack Elix, and Arne Thell, with Gallowayella coppinsii assigned as the type species. The generic name honours New Zealand lichenologist David John Galloway (1942–2014).

Species

Gallowayella aphrodites 
Gallowayella awasthiana 
Gallowayella borealis 
Gallowayella concinna 
Gallowayella coppinsii 
Gallowayella fulva 
Gallowayella galericulata 
Gallowayella gallowayi 
Gallowayella hasseana 
Gallowayella montana 
Gallowayella poeltii 
Gallowayella sogdiana 
Gallowayella tibellii 
Gallowayella weberi 
Gallowayella wetmorei

References

Teloschistales
Lecanoromycetes genera
Lichen genera
Taxa described in 2012
Taxa named by John Alan Elix
Taxa named by Ingvar Kärnefelt
Taxa named by Sergey Kondratyuk